A mindwipe is a fictional memory erasure procedure in which the subject's memories and sometimes personality are erased. Often those are replaced by new memories more useful to those who are carrying out the mindwiping. It is a more thorough form of brainwashing. It is sometimes used as an alternative to capital punishment, or to make the subject more useful to the system. The mindwipe can be performed by a hypnotic or magical ability, or by an electronic device. It is often coupled with stories where the characters have amnesia, although the latter concept includes cases that occur naturally or by accident instead of the result of a deliberate procedure.

Examples

 The 1952 short story Paycheck by Philip K. Dick, in which an engineer, who has been working on a top-secret project after which his memory is wiped, discovers that he has not received any payments, but an assortment of random items, and that the secret police are after him. It was made into a film in 2003.
 Alfred Bester's 1953 novel The Demolished Man; in which the technique is labeled "Demolition".
 The 1966 short story "We Can Remember It for You Wholesale" by Philip K. Dick in which a businessman undergoes a procedure where he receives memories of a vacation on Mars, only to discover that the procedure has backfired, and that his mind had already been wiped. It was the basis for the 1990 film Total Recall.
 The plot of Ralph Blum's 1970 novel The Simultaneous Man revolves around mind erasure and personality transfer 
 The TV series UFO features amnesia injections.
 Robert Silverberg's 1972 novel The Second Trip about a criminal whose new personality struggles to suppress his original criminal personality which was revived by telepathic contact with a friend of the old personality.
 In the TV series Blake's 7, Blake had been mindwiped prior to the events in the series, but begins to recall things.
 The 1980 novel The Bourne Identity by Robert Ludlum. Jason Bourne is an amnesiac who discovers that he has had his memories wiped, but not his skills and instincts, of being an expert assassin. This has been adapted into a book and movie series.
 The Men in Black comic book series and film franchise, which features a device called the neuralyzer, which performs the mind wipe with a camera flash. The agent then makes a hypnotic suggestion to fill in what happened.
 In the TV series Babylon 5, the Psi-Corps is an organization whose members have telepathic abilities; they are able to assist doctors in a procedure that erases memories and traits in criminals, called "Death Of Personality" as a punishment.
 Dark City revolves around an elaborate experiment on abducted humans by extraterrestrials in which their memories are constantly being erased and replaced.
 Eoin Colfer's Artemis Fowl novel series, where it is one of the technologies/abilities available.
 In the cartoon series Totally Spies!, various characters get their memory wiped. This also occurs in its spin-off series The Amazing Spiez
 The 2004 comic book series Identity Crisis, where Zatanna mindwipes Doctor Light's memories of having sexually assaulted Ralph Dibny's wife Sue.
 The 2004 film Eternal Sunshine of the Spotless Mind has the main characters pay to have their memories of their relationship erased, so they can meet again to restart their relationship afresh.
 In the 2008 Doctor Who finale Journey's End, Donna Noble becomes a Time Lord Meta-Crisis, but it takes a toll on her mind, so in order to save her life, the Doctor had to erase her memories of his travels with her.
 The 2009 TV series Dollhouse is about a corporation where certain employees called Actives (or Dolls) are mind-wiped and implanted with custom personalities and abilities to service their clients.
 The 2009 anime series Eden of the East, in which the main character discovers that he has had his memory erased and that he is involved in a high-stakes competition.
 The 2013 video game Remember Me, in which the protagonist gets her memories wiped by the megacorporation Memorize. The game also allows the player to manipulate a person's memories using a technique called "remixing".

 In Rayark Inc.'s Cytus II, Ivy/Aesir erases their fan's memories after performing at their own festival.
 The 2015 video game Fallout 4, in which some escaped synths have their memories wiped by the Railroad.
 In the 2022 TV series Severance, a medical procedure is applied to employees to separate non-work memories from work memories.

See also
 Drug-induced amnesia § In popular culture
 Mind control in popular culture
 Neuralyzer

References

Further reading
 
 
 

Science fiction themes